Next Jump is an e-commerce company. The company handles loyalty programs for Dell, AARP, Intel, Novartis and Hilton Hotel.

Headquartered in New York City, the company has some merchant partners, both retailers and manufacturers. The firm has offices in New York City, Boston, San Francisco and London.

Partnerships and acquisitions

LivingSocial
In April 2011, LivingSocial announced a partnership with Next Jump that allows LivingSocial to present its daily offers to consumers in the Next Jump network. On June 9, 2011, Next Jump introduced OO.com  as the first product from this partnership. On this site, people enter their zipcode and are presented with a map showing LivingSocial deals, and  get rewarded with points if they buy something. As of 2021, the partnership effort is known as WOW Perks.

Flightcaster
In January 2011, the firm acquired a start-up called FlightCaster that helps people predict flight delays.

Management style

Next Jump is featured as a case study in the 2016 book, "An Everyone Culture: Becoming a Deliberately Developmental Organization", as an example of a "deliberately developmental organization". Authors Kegan and Lahey say that Next Jump incorporates a number of management, coaching and teaching practices that are "organized around the simple but radical conviction that organizations will best prosper when they are more deeply aligned with people's strongest motive, which is to grow."

References

External links

OO.com

Customer loyalty programs
Marketing companies of the United States
Online companies of the United States